Rex Harold Johns (21 May 1935 – 17 December 2009) was an Australian rules footballer for the Port Adelaide Football Club in the South Australian National Football League (SANFL).

Football career 
During an era of dour defence, Johns' ability to score goals at an average 3.37 per game was exceptional. During his time at the club he won the club's leading goalkicker award six times and the competition's award four times. He was a member of four premiership teams for Port Adelaide.

Personal life 
Rex Johns died after a valiant battle with cancer on the 16 December 2009 at the age of 74.

Reputation 
Rex Johns was the childhood idol of Malcolm Blight.

References

1935 births
2009 deaths
Australian rules footballers from South Australia
Port Adelaide Football Club (SANFL) players
Port Adelaide Football Club players (all competitions)